Srdjan Djekanovic (Serbian: Срђан Ђекановић/Srđan Đekanović; born 8 January 1983) is a Canadian retired professional soccer player.

Career

Early career in Europe
Djekanovic's professional career has included stops at Zemun, Zmaj, Radnički Obrenovac, and Železničar Beograd in Serbia from 2001–2004.

North America
Djekanovic played two seasons of college soccer for the University of British Columbia, with whom he won the CIS National Championships in 2005. At the same time he played for the Vancouver Whitecaps FC, with whom he also won the USL First Division Championship in 2006.

On 2 June 2007, Djekanovic made his first ever MLS start in goal in a match versus the Colorado Rapids. He recorded his first victory as his Toronto FC won 2–1, and he earned his first clean sheet on 17 June 2007 in a 4–0 Toronto FC win over FC Dallas. Toronto FC finished the 2007 season with the team record 6–17–7, while the team record with Djekanovic starting was 2–3–2, with 1.28 goals against average, both by far being the team best. Djekanovic also played in 10 reserve team games during the 2007 season while with Toronto FC, not allowing a goal in his last 6 games played with the reserves.

Following the 2007 MLS season, he returned to UBC and backstopped them to yet another national championship. On 28 February 2008, Djekanovic was signed to his former team, the Vancouver Whitecaps FC. On 13 August 2008, Djekanovic was released by the Whitecaps. After leaving the Whitecaps, Djekanovic had been linked with a move to Houston Dynamo of the MLS.

He returned to the UBC Thunderbirds for a short period of time in September 2008. On 9 January 2009 he signed with Montreal Impact.

He is the first player in Canadian soccer history to play for Vancouver Whitecaps FC, Montreal Impact and Toronto FC.

International
Despite being born in Yugoslavia, Djekanovic is a naturalized Canadian citizen. He made three appearances for the Canadian U20 national team in 2003. He was called up to the senior side to face Jamaica on 31 January 2010 but remained on the bench.

Teaching
In 2013, Djekanovic taught as a TOC at Alderson Elementary (Coquitlam, BC). Also he taught briefly at Ridgeview Elementary (West Vancouver, BC), and he also taught at Pinetree Way Elementary as a TOC and a part-time teacher.

Honors
Montreal Impact
 USL First Division Championship: 2009

Vancouver Whitecaps
 USL First Division Championship: 2006

UBC Thunderbirds
 CIS Canadian Interuniversity Sport Championship: 2005, 2007

References

External links
 Official site

1983 births
Living people
Footballers from Belgrade
Association football goalkeepers
Canadian soccer players
Canada men's youth international soccer players
Canadian expatriate soccer players
Canadian people of Serbian descent
Montreal Impact (1992–2011) players
Major League Soccer players
Naturalized citizens of Canada
Serbian expatriate footballers
Serbian footballers
Serbian emigrants to Canada
FK Zemun players
FK Radnički Obrenovac players
Toronto FC players
University of British Columbia alumni
UBC Thunderbirds soccer players
USL First Division players
USSF Division 2 Professional League players
Vancouver Whitecaps (1986–2010) players